WGBH may refer to:

 WGBH Educational Foundation, based in Boston, Massachusetts, United States
 WGBH (FM), a public radio station at Boston, Massachusetts on 89.7 MHz owned by the WGBH Educational Foundation
 WGBH-TV, a public television station at Boston Massachusetts owned by the WGBH Educational Foundation